Peter Coyne may refer to:

 Peter Coyne (footballer) (born 1958), English footballer
 Peter Coyne (politician) (1917–2001), Australian politician
 Peter Coyne (rugby league) (born 1964), Australian rugby league player